Mario Ignacio Regueiro Pintos (born 14 September 1978) is a Uruguayan retired footballer who played mainly as a left winger but also on the other flank, and even as a forward.

During his professional career he played mainly in Spain, amassing La Liga totals of 167 matches and 25 goals over the course of eight seasons. Other than in his country, he also competed in Greece and Argentina.

Regueiro represented Uruguay at the 2002 World Cup.

Club career
Born in Montevideo, Regueiro started his professional career with C.A. Cerro and local Club Nacional de Football. In 2000, he joined Racing de Santander in Spain, having made an immediate impact. In his last year, he ranked second in goals for the Cantabrians – eight, one short of Yossi Benayoun – as they barely avoided relegation.

In late June 2005, Regueiro signed with fellow La Liga club Valencia CF, arriving on a free transfer. With the Che, he was mainly used as a replacement, and also lost the vast majority of his second season due to a severe knee injury; after the campaign was over, he also acquired Spanish nationality.

In the summer of 2008, after a loan to relegated Real Murcia, Regueiro was again loaned by Valencia, now to Aris Thessaloniki F.C. for one year, only to receive his free transfer a month later and sign a three-year contract with the Greek team. However, after just one season, he was released, returning to his homeland and Nacional.

In July 2010, aged nearly 32, Regueiro moved to Argentina's Club Atlético Lanús.

International career
Regueiro made 29 appearances for Uruguay, his debut coming on 8 October 2000 in a 2002 FIFA World Cup qualifier against Argentina, a 1–2 away loss. During the final stages in Japan and South Korea, he appeared twice for the nation in an eventual group stage exit, against Denmark (1–2) and Senegal (3–3).

Previously, Regueiro helped the under-20s finish second at the 1997 FIFA World Youth Championship.

Honours

Club
Nacional
Uruguayan Primera División: 1998, 2000

International
Uruguay
FIFA U-20 World Cup: runner-up 1997

References

External links

National team data 

1978 births
Living people
Footballers from Montevideo
Afro-Uruguayan
Uruguayan people of Portuguese descent
Uruguayan people of Spanish descent
Uruguayan people of Galician descent
Uruguayan footballers
Association football wingers
Uruguayan Primera División players
C.A. Cerro players
Club Nacional de Football players
Defensor Sporting players
La Liga players
Segunda División players
Racing de Santander players
Valencia CF players
Real Murcia players
Super League Greece players
Aris Thessaloniki F.C. players
Argentine Primera División players
Club Atlético Lanús footballers
Racing Club de Avellaneda footballers
Uruguay youth international footballers
Uruguay under-20 international footballers
Uruguay international footballers
2002 FIFA World Cup players
Uruguayan expatriate footballers
Expatriate footballers in Spain
Expatriate footballers in Greece
Expatriate footballers in Argentina
Uruguayan expatriate sportspeople in Spain
Uruguayan expatriate sportspeople in Greece
Uruguayan expatriate sportspeople in Argentina